Daybreak is the title of the second solo album by Christian singer-songwriter Paul Field. It is a musical about the last days of Christ's life on earth.

The song "Walking into the Wind" was originally on the 1977 Nutshell LP Flyaway.

Track listing

Side one
 "Daybreak" (Paul Field)
 "It's You" (Paul Field)
 "Chasing Shadows" (Paul Field)
 "Walking into the Wind" (Paul Field)
 "I Believe" (Paul Field)

Side two
 "Stony Ground" (Paul Field)
 "Make Me a Mountain" (Paul Field)
 "All Down to You" (Paul Field)
 "Peace Like a River" (Paul Field)
 "Grow in Grace" (Paul Field)
 "Daybreak (Reprise)" (Paul Field)

Personnel
Paul Field: Guitar and Vocals
Ian Mosley: Drums
John G. Perry: Bass
Dave Cooke:Keyboards
Tom Blades: Guitar
Julie Moon: Vocals
John Daniels: Vocals
Edwina Lawrie: Vocals
Mark Williamson: Vocals

Production notes
Produced by Paul Field
Engineered by Andy Geirus
Recorded at TMC Studios, London

1983 albums
Paul Field (Christian singer) albums